Deyneka (Deineka) is a surname. Notable people with the surname include:

 Aleksandr Deyneka (1899–1969), Russian artist
 Peter Deyneka (1897–1987), Russian-American evangelist and missionary to the Russian diaspora

See also 
 Deyneko
 Dayneko
 9514 Deineka, asteroid